The Optare Excel was a low-floor full-size single-decker bus manufactured by Optare. Manufactured as an integral bus, the Excel was launched in 1995 as one of the first low floor single-deck vehicles, replacing the step-entrance Optare Sigma. The styling of the body was in keeping with existing Optare products. At the front, a simple flat panel with the Optare name was set between two pairs of twin headlamps, below a very large front windscreen. Approximately 600 were built.

Powertrain
Power came from a Cummins 6BT, a 6-cylinder turbo diesel engine. A Mercedes-Benz OM906LA engine was an option with the Excel 2. Both transmitted their power via an Allison B300R gearbox.

Lengths
The Excel was built in a range of lengths, and in Optare tradition, the chassis code reflected this. An L960 was 9.6m in length; an L1000 was 10.0m in length, and so on; with L1070 and L1150 variants built. Seating ranged from 27 in the L960, 35 in the L1070, 43 in the L1150 and 45 in the L1180, although these figures can vary.

Excel 2
The Excel was updated in 1999, with the front similar to that of the Optare Solo and with round headlights, two less rear lights, and a repositioned fuel-filler cap. This was known as the Excel 2, which also replaced the Delta which by then had finished production, as well as the original Excel, which was still being sold until late 2000. Excel 2s were only built in L1070, L1150 and L1180 configurations.

Operators
The first production examples of the Excel were purchased by Blackpool Transport in 1996, followed by orders from Nottingham City Transport and Reading Buses. Reading, a popular customer of Optare buses, would later go on to purchase 45 Excels from 1997 to 2000, as well as taking on second-hand acquisitions. These included 15 Excels purchased new by Cardiff Bus in 1997.

Trent Buses were the biggest operator of Excels, ordering a total of 112 of the type from 1998 to 2001.

East Yorkshire Motor Services purchased a total of 24 Excels between 1996 and 1999 for low-floor operations in Kingston upon Hull and Scarborough, while 16 Excels were purchased by the Stagecoach Group in 2001 for operation in Worksop with their East Midlands subsidiary. First Leicester purchased ten Excels in 1997, while Go North East also purchased examples.

In London, London United purchased six Excels in 1997, initially branded for use on route 371, while Metrobus purchased ten a year prior. Other London operators included Travel London and Thorpes, the latter purchasing four Excels for operation on the wheelchair-friendly Stationlink network.

Optare also built a small export market for the Excel, selling examples to Malta and Hungary. The Hungarian models were badged as the NABI 700SE and had three-door Excel bodies built on the Scania L94UB chassis.

Replacement
The Excel was replaced by the Optare Tempo, but the design is used for another Hungarian market bus, this time the NABI 700SE, which uses a Scania powerplant.

Gallery

References

External links

Low-floor buses
Midibuses
Excel
Vehicles introduced in 1996